Derry Pemberton (born February 1, 1971) is a sprinter who represents the United States Virgin Islands. He competed in the men's 4 × 100 metres relay at the 1992 Summer Olympics. Pemberton won a bronze medal in the 4 x 100 metres relay at the 1991 Pan American Games.

References

External links
 

1971 births
Living people
Olympic track and field athletes of the United States Virgin Islands
Athletes (track and field) at the 1992 Summer Olympics
United States Virgin Islands male sprinters
Athletes (track and field) at the 1991 Pan American Games
Athletes (track and field) at the 1995 Pan American Games
Pan American Games medalists in athletics (track and field)
Pan American Games bronze medalists for the United States Virgin Islands
Place of birth missing (living people)
Medalists at the 1991 Pan American Games